Maria Josepha Hermengilde Esterházy de Galantha (born von Liechtenstein, 13 April, 1768 — 8 August, 1845) was the daughter of Franz Josef I of Liechtenstein. On 15 September 1783 she married Prince Nikolaus II Esterházy de Galantha, who in 1794 became the Prince of Esterházy. In 1785 she bore a son, Paul Anton and in 1788 a daughter, Leopoldine.

Patroness
Like her husband Maria was a patron of artists, and especially of Joseph Haydn, who from 1796 to 1802 was commissioned to write a yearly Mass to be performed on her nameday (8 September, the Nativity of the BVM). Thus originated the Heiligmesse (1796), Paukenmesse (1797), Nelsonmesse (1798), Theresienmesse (1799), Schöpfungsmesse (1801) and Harmoniemesse (1802). For her 1807 nameday  Ludwig van Beethoven composed his Mass in C major, op. 86. Johann Nepomuk Hummel wrote five Masses for her nameday: Mass in E-flat major, Op. 80 (1804), Mass in D minor, WoO. 13 (1805), Mass in C major, WoO. 12 (1806), Mass in B-flat major, Op. 77 (1808) & Mass in D major, Op. 111 (1810) One final Mass was written by Jan Ladislav Dussek, Missa Solomnelle in G major, C. 256 (1811).

References

External links 

 Maria Josepha Hermengilde Fürstin Esterházy

Maria Josepha
Liechtenstein princesses
1768 births
1845 deaths
Daughters of monarchs